The  is a national expressway in the Tōkai region of Japan. It is owned and operated by Central Nippon Expressway Company.

Naming

The route primarily follows the north shore of Ise Bay (wangan means bayshore in Japanese).

Officially, the route has three designations. The section from Toyota-higashi Junction to Tōkai Junction is referred to as part of the Second Tōkai Expressway. The section from Tōkai Junction to Tobishima Interchange is referred to as part of National Route 302. This section is not classified as a national expressway but rather as a national highway for motor vehicles only with national expressway concurrency. There is no difference in the design standard of this section compared with the rest of the expressway. Finally, the section from Tobishima Interchange to Yokkaichi-kita Junction is referred to as part of the Kinki Expressway Nagoya Kobe Route.

Overview

The Isewangan is planned to link the future Shin-Tōmei Expressway to the east and Shin-Meishin Expressway to the west. These 3 expressways will replace the Tōmei Expressway and Meishin Expressway as the primary roadway linking Tokyo, Nagoya, and Osaka.

The first segment (Meikō-Chūō Interchange to Tobishima Interchange) was opened in 1985 as the Isewangan Road and the most recent addition was opened in 2005. The final segment (Yokkaichi Junction to Yokkaichi-kita Junction) is planned to connect with extensions to the Shin-Meishin Expressway and Tōkai-Kanjō Expressway. The route is 6 lanes for its entire length.

The expressway features several bridges. Three bridges span the Nagoya Port area (collectively known as the Meikō Triton) and two bridges span the Kiso River and Ibi River (collectively known as the Twinkle Bridges).

List of interchanges and features

 IC - interchange, JCT - junction, PA - parking area, BR - bridge

Gallery

References

External links 

Central Nippon Expressway Company 

Expressways in Japan